Lisa K. Curtis is an American politician and attorney who served as a member of the New Mexico Senate from 2012 to 2013. Curtis was appointed to the Senate after the resignation of Kent Cravens. She was defeated in her bid for a full term by Mark Moores and left office in January 2013.

Education 
Curtis earned a Bachelor of Arts degree from the University of New Mexico and a Juris Doctor from the University of New Mexico School of Law.

Career 
Since graduating from law school in 1993, Curtis has worked as a malpractice attorney in Albuquerque, New Mexico. She is a managing partner of Curtis and Co. In 2012, Curtis was appointed to the New Mexico Senate by then-Governor Susana Martinez after the resignation of Kent Cravens. In November 2013, Curtis was defeated for election to a full term by Republican nominee Mark Moores.

Personal life 
Curtis and her husband, Bob, have four children.

References 

Living people
University of New Mexico alumni
University of New Mexico School of Law alumni
New Mexico lawyers
Women state legislators in New Mexico
Democratic Party New Mexico state senators
Year of birth missing (living people)
21st-century American politicians
21st-century American women politicians